The following is a list of people from Franklin County, Kansas.  The area includes the cities of Ottawa, Wellsville, Pomona, and other cities rural areas in the county.  Inclusion on the list should be reserved for notable people past and present who have resided in the county, either in cities or rural areas.

Arts
 Don Harrison, former anchor of CNN Headline News
 Stanley Sheldon, bass guitar player
 Chely Wright, country music star and songwriter

Athletics

 Bill Grigsby, former sportscaster for the Kansas City Chiefs
 Steve Grogan, New England Patriots quarterback, 1975-1990
 Kent Kessinger, head football coach of Ottawa Braves
 Lou McEvoy, Major League Baseball pitcher, New York Yankees
 Wade Moore, head football coach Kansas State University, 1901 season
 Jeremy Petty, ARCA Remax Series driver
 Arthur Schabinger, football and basketball player and coach, credited (although disputed) with throwing the first forward pass in college football history
 Willie Ramsdell, Major League baseball pitcher

Business
 Paul Helms, executive in the baking industry; sports philanthropist

Clergy
 Jacob L. Beilhart, founder and leader of a communitarian group known as the Spirit Fruit Society
 John and Edith Kilbuck, Moravian missionaries in southwestern Alaska in the late 19th and early 20th centuries
 Jotham Meeker, missionary and printer who printed over sixty publications in Native American languages

Politics
 Aldamar Elder, member of Kansas House of Representatives
 Peter Percival Elder, sixth Lieutenant Governor of Kansas
 Gary Hart, former presidential candidate
 Kevin Jones, member of Kansas House of Representatives
 Jerry Voorhis, member of United States House of Representatives from California

Technology
 Steven Hawley, Space Shuttle astronaut
 Lloyd Stearman, aviator and aircraft designer
 John G. Thompson, mathematician, winner of 1992 Wolf Prize and 2008 Abel Prize

See also

 Lists of people from Kansas

References

Franklin County